This is a list of PlayStation (PS1) games digitally re-released on the PlayStation Store in Japan. These are the original games software emulated. Initially, downloadable PS1 titles were only available to play on PlayStation Portable (PSP). An update released in April 2007 enabled playing of these purchased PS1 titles on PlayStation 3 (PS3). Some titles can also be played on other PlayStation systems. PlayStation Vita (PSV) and PlayStation TV (PSTV) support the same titles as each other. Those released on PlayStation 4 (PS4) and PlayStation 5 (PS5) display in high-definition and may feature the addition of trophies. The PS4 and PS5 releases are bundled together, and the former is also playable on PS5 through backwards compatibility. If a downloadable PS1 game has been purchased for a device released prior to the PS4, the title is automatically added to the user's library on all devices for which there is a release.

Playing PS1 titles on a PSP or PSV does not support local multiplayer that was designed to use multiple controllers. However, PSTV supports this feature.

See also
Lists of Virtual Console games
High-definition remasters for PlayStation consoles
List of PS one Classics (North America)
List of PS one Classics (PAL region)

References

1
 
 

ja:ゲームアーカイブス